The Bellman filter is an algorithm that estimates the value sequence of hidden states in a state-space model. It is a generalization of the Kalman filter, allowing for nonlinearity in both the state and observation equations. The principle behind the Bellman filter is an approximation of the maximum a posteriori estimator, which makes it robust to heavy-tailed noise. It is in general a very fast method, since at each iteration only the very last state value is estimated. The algorithm owes its name to the Bellman equation, which plays a central role in the derivation of the algorithm.

References

Control theory
Nonlinear filters
Signal estimation